In organic chemistry, a carbohydrate is a biomolecule consisting of carbon (C), hydrogen (H) and oxygen (O) atoms, usually with a hydrogen–oxygen atom ratio of 2:1 (as in water) and thus with the empirical formula  (where m may or may not be different from n), which does not mean the H has covalent bonds with O (for example with , H has a covalent bond with C but not with O). However, not all carbohydrates conform to this precise stoichiometric definition (e.g., uronic acids, deoxy-sugars such as fucose), nor are all chemicals that do conform to this definition automatically classified as carbohydrates (e.g. formaldehyde and acetic acid).

The term is most common in biochemistry, where it is a synonym of saccharide, a group that includes sugars, starch, and cellulose. The saccharides are divided into four chemical groups: monosaccharides, disaccharides, oligosaccharides, and polysaccharides. Monosaccharides and disaccharides, the smallest (lower molecular weight) carbohydrates, are  commonly referred to as sugars. While the scientific nomenclature of carbohydrates is complex, the names of the monosaccharides and disaccharides very often end in the suffix -ose, which was originally taken from the word glucose, and is used for almost all sugars, e.g. fructose (fruit sugar), sucrose (cane or beet sugar), ribose, lactose (milk sugar), etc.

Carbohydrates perform numerous roles in living organisms. Polysaccharides serve as an energy store (e.g. starch and glycogen) and as structural components (e.g. cellulose in plants and chitin in arthropods). The 5-carbon monosaccharide ribose is an important component of coenzymes (e.g. ATP, FAD and NAD) and the backbone of the genetic molecule known as RNA. The related deoxyribose is a component of DNA. Saccharides and their derivatives include many other important biomolecules that play key roles in the immune system, fertilization, preventing pathogenesis, blood clotting, and development.

Carbohydrates are central to nutrition and are found in a wide variety of natural and processed foods. Starch is a polysaccharide and is abundant in cereals (wheat, maize, rice), potatoes, and processed food based on cereal flour, such as bread, pizza or pasta. Sugars appear in human diet mainly as table sugar (sucrose, extracted from sugarcane or sugar beets), lactose (abundant in milk), glucose and fructose, both of which occur naturally in honey, many fruits, and some vegetables. Table sugar, milk, or honey are often added to drinks and many prepared foods such as jam, biscuits and cakes.

Cellulose, a polysaccharide found in the cell walls of all plants, is one of the main components of insoluble dietary fiber. Although it is not digestible by humans, cellulose and insoluble dietary fiber generally help maintain a healthy digestive system by facilitating bowel movements. Other polysaccharides contained in dietary fiber include resistant starch and inulin, which feed some bacteria in the microbiota of the large intestine, and are metabolized by these bacteria to yield short-chain fatty acids.

Terminology
In scientific literature, the term "carbohydrate" has many synonyms, like "sugar" (in the broad sense), "saccharide", "ose", "glucide", "hydrate of carbon" or "polyhydroxy compounds with aldehyde or ketone". Some of these terms, specially "carbohydrate" and "sugar", are also used with other meanings.

In food science and in many informal contexts, the term "carbohydrate" often means any food that is particularly rich in the complex carbohydrate starch (such as cereals, bread and pasta) or simple carbohydrates, such as sugar (found in candy, jams, and desserts).  This informality is sometimes confusing since it confounds chemical structure and digestibility in humans.

Often in lists of nutritional information, such as the USDA National Nutrient Database, the term "carbohydrate" (or "carbohydrate by difference") is used for everything other than water, protein, fat, ash, and ethanol. This includes chemical compounds such as acetic or lactic acid, which are not normally considered carbohydrates. It also includes dietary fiber which is a carbohydrate but which does not contribute  food energy (kilocalories) in humans, even though it is often included in the calculation of total food energy just as though it did (i.e., as if it were a digestible and absorbable carbohydrate such as a sugar).
In the strict sense, "sugar" is applied for sweet, soluble carbohydrates, many of which are used in human food.

History

Structure 
Formerly the name "carbohydrate" was used in chemistry for any compound with the formula Cm (H2O)n. Following this definition, some chemists considered formaldehyde (CH2O) to be the simplest carbohydrate, while others claimed that title for glycolaldehyde. Today, the term is generally understood in the biochemistry sense, which excludes compounds with only one or two carbons and includes many biological carbohydrates which deviate from this formula. For example, while the above representative formulas would seem to capture the commonly known carbohydrates, ubiquitous and abundant carbohydrates often deviate from this. For example, carbohydrates often display chemical groups such as: N-acetyl (e.g. chitin), sulfate (e.g. glycosaminoglycans), carboxylic acid  and deoxy modifications (e.g. fucose and sialic acid).

Natural saccharides are generally built of simple carbohydrates called monosaccharides with general formula (CH2O)n where n is three or more. A typical monosaccharide has the structure H–(CHOH)x(C=O)–(CHOH)y–H, that is, an aldehyde or ketone with many hydroxyl groups added, usually one on each carbon atom that is not part of the aldehyde or ketone functional group. Examples of monosaccharides are glucose, fructose, and glyceraldehydes. However, some biological substances commonly called "monosaccharides" do not conform to this formula (e.g. uronic acids and deoxy-sugars such as fucose) and there are many chemicals that do conform to this formula but are not considered to be monosaccharides (e.g. formaldehyde CH2O and inositol (CH2O)6).

The open-chain form of a monosaccharide often coexists with a closed ring form where the aldehyde/ketone carbonyl group carbon (C=O) and hydroxyl group (–OH) react forming a hemiacetal with a new C–O–C bridge.

Monosaccharides can be linked together into what are called polysaccharides (or oligosaccharides) in a large variety of ways. Many carbohydrates contain one or more modified monosaccharide units that have had one or more groups replaced or removed. For example, deoxyribose, a component of DNA, is a modified version of ribose; chitin is composed of repeating units of N-acetyl glucosamine, a nitrogen-containing form of glucose.

Division
Carbohydrates are polyhydroxy aldehydes, ketones, alcohols, acids, their simple derivatives and their polymers having linkages of the acetal type. They may be classified according to their degree of polymerization, and may be divided initially into three principal groups, namely sugars, oligosaccharides and polysaccharides.

Monosaccharides

Monosaccharides are the simplest carbohydrates in that they cannot be hydrolyzed to smaller carbohydrates. They are aldehydes or ketones with two or more hydroxyl groups. The general chemical formula of an unmodified monosaccharide is (C•H2O)n, literally a "carbon hydrate". Monosaccharides are important fuel molecules as well as building blocks for nucleic acids. The smallest monosaccharides, for which n=3, are dihydroxyacetone and D- and L-glyceraldehydes.

Classification of monosaccharides
The α and β anomers of glucose. Note the position of the hydroxyl group (red or green) on the anomeric carbon relative to the CH2OH group bound to carbon 5: they either have identical absolute configurations (R,R or S,S) (α), or opposite absolute configurations (R,S or S,R) (β).
Monosaccharides are classified according to three different characteristics: the placement of its carbonyl group, the number of carbon atoms it contains, and its chiral handedness. If the carbonyl group is an aldehyde, the monosaccharide is an aldose; if the carbonyl group is a ketone, the monosaccharide is a ketose. Monosaccharides with three carbon atoms are called trioses, those with four are called tetroses, five are called pentoses, six are hexoses, and so on. These two systems of classification are often combined. For example, glucose is an aldohexose (a six-carbon aldehyde), ribose is an aldopentose (a five-carbon aldehyde), and fructose is a ketohexose (a six-carbon ketone).

Each carbon atom bearing a hydroxyl group (-OH), with the exception of the first and last carbons, are asymmetric, making them stereo centers with two possible configurations each (R or S). Because of this asymmetry, a number of isomers may exist for any given monosaccharide formula. Using Le Bel-van't Hoff rule, the aldohexose D-glucose, for example, has the formula (C·H2O)6, of which four of its six carbons atoms are stereogenic, making D-glucose one of 24=16 possible stereoisomers. In the case of glyceraldehydes, an aldotriose, there is one pair of possible stereoisomers, which are enantiomers and epimers. 1, 3-dihydroxyacetone, the ketose corresponding to the aldose glyceraldehydes, is a symmetric molecule with no stereo centers. The assignment of D or L is made according to the orientation of the asymmetric carbon furthest from the carbonyl group: in a standard Fischer projection if the hydroxyl group is on the right the molecule is a D sugar, otherwise it is an L sugar. The "D-" and "L-" prefixes should not be confused with "d-" or "l-", which indicate the direction that the sugar  rotates plane polarized light. This usage of "d-" and "l-" is no longer followed in carbohydrate chemistry.

Ring-straight chain isomerism

The aldehyde or ketone group of a straight-chain monosaccharide will react reversibly with a hydroxyl group on a different carbon atom to form a hemiacetal or hemiketal, forming a heterocyclic ring with an oxygen bridge between two carbon atoms. Rings with five and six atoms are called furanose and pyranose forms, respectively, and exist in equilibrium with the straight-chain form.

During the conversion from straight-chain form to the cyclic form, the carbon atom containing the carbonyl oxygen, called the anomeric carbon, becomes a stereogenic center with two possible configurations: The oxygen atom may take a position either above or below the plane of the ring. The resulting possible pair of stereoisomers is called anomers. In the α anomer, the -OH substituent on the anomeric carbon rests on the opposite side (trans) of the ring from the CH2OH side branch. The alternative form, in which the CH2OH substituent and the anomeric hydroxyl are on the same side (cis) of the plane of the ring, is called the β anomer.

Use in living organisms
Monosaccharides are the major fuel source for metabolism, being used both as an energy source (glucose being the most important in nature as it is the product of photosynthesis in plants) and in biosynthesis. When monosaccharides are not immediately needed, they are often converted to more space-efficient (i.e., less water-soluble) forms, often polysaccharides. In many animals, including humans, this storage form is glycogen, especially in liver and muscle cells. In plants, starch is used for the same purpose. The most abundant carbohydrate, cellulose, is a structural component of the cell wall of plants and many forms of algae. Ribose is a component of RNA. Deoxyribose is a component of DNA. Lyxose is a component of lyxoflavin found in the human heart. Ribulose and xylulose occur in the pentose phosphate pathway. Galactose, a component of milk sugar lactose, is found in galactolipids in plant cell membranes and in glycoproteins in many tissues. Mannose occurs in human metabolism, especially in the glycosylation of certain proteins. Fructose, or fruit sugar, is found in many plants and humans, it is metabolized in the liver, absorbed directly into the intestines during digestion, and found in semen. Trehalose, a major sugar of insects, is rapidly hydrolyzed into two glucose molecules to support continuous flight.

Disaccharides

Two joined monosaccharides are called a disaccharide, the simplest kind of polysaccharide. Examples include sucrose and lactose. They are composed of two monosaccharide units bound together by a covalent bond known as a glycosidic linkage formed via a dehydration reaction, resulting in the loss of a hydrogen atom from one monosaccharide and a hydroxyl group from the other. The formula of unmodified disaccharides is C12H22O11. Although there are numerous kinds of disaccharides, a handful of disaccharides are particularly notable.

Sucrose, pictured to the right, is the most abundant disaccharide, and the main form in which carbohydrates are transported in plants. It is composed of one D-glucose molecule and one D-fructose molecule. The systematic name for sucrose, O-α-D-glucopyranosyl-(1→2)-D-fructofuranoside, indicates four things:
 Its monosaccharides: glucose and fructose
 Their ring types: glucose is a pyranose and fructose is a furanose
 How they are linked together: the oxygen on carbon number 1 (C1) of α-D-glucose is linked to the C2 of D-fructose.
 The -oside suffix indicates that the anomeric carbon of both monosaccharides participates in the glycosidic bond.

Lactose, a disaccharide composed of one D-galactose molecule and one D-glucose molecule, occurs naturally in mammalian milk. The systematic name for lactose is O-β-D-galactopyranosyl-(1→4)-D-glucopyranose. Other notable disaccharides include maltose (two D-glucoses linked α-1,4) and cellobiose (two D-glucoses linked β-1,4). Disaccharides can be classified into two types: reducing and non-reducing disaccharides. If the functional group is present in bonding with another sugar unit, it is called a reducing disaccharide or biose.

Nutrition

Carbohydrate consumed in food yields 3.87 kilocalories of energy per gram for simple sugars, and 3.57 to 4.12 kilocalories per gram for complex carbohydrate in most other foods. Relatively high levels of carbohydrate are associated with processed foods or refined foods made from plants, including sweets, cookies and candy, table sugar, honey, soft drinks, breads and crackers, jams and fruit products, pastas and breakfast cereals. Lower amounts of carbohydrate are usually associated with unrefined foods, including beans, tubers, rice, and unrefined fruit.  Animal-based foods generally have the lowest carbohydrate levels, although milk does contain a high proportion of lactose.

Organisms typically cannot metabolize all types of carbohydrate to yield energy. Glucose is a nearly universal and accessible source of energy. Many organisms also have the ability to metabolize other monosaccharides and disaccharides but glucose is often metabolized first. In Escherichia coli, for example, the lac operon will express enzymes for the digestion of lactose when it is present, but if both lactose and glucose are present the lac operon is repressed, resulting in the glucose being used first (see: Diauxie). Polysaccharides are also common sources of energy. Many organisms can easily break down starches into glucose; most organisms, however, cannot metabolize cellulose or other polysaccharides like chitin and arabinoxylans. These carbohydrate types can be metabolized by some bacteria and protists. Ruminants and termites, for example, use microorganisms to process cellulose. Even though these complex carbohydrates are not very digestible, they represent an important dietary element for humans, called dietary fiber. Fiber enhances digestion, among other benefits.

The Institute of Medicine recommends that American and Canadian adults get between 45 and 65% of dietary energy from whole-grain carbohydrates. The Food and Agriculture Organization and World Health Organization jointly recommend that national dietary guidelines set a goal of 55–75% of total energy from carbohydrates, but only 10% directly from sugars (their term for simple carbohydrates).  A 2017 Cochrane Systematic Review concluded that there was insufficient evidence to support the claim that whole grain diets can affect cardiovascular disease.

Classification
Nutritionists often refer to carbohydrates as either simple or complex. However, the exact distinction between these groups can be ambiguous. The term complex carbohydrate was first used in the U.S. Senate Select Committee on Nutrition and Human Needs publication Dietary Goals for the United States (1977) where it was intended to distinguish sugars from other carbohydrates (which were perceived to be nutritionally superior). However, the report put "fruit, vegetables and whole-grains" in the complex carbohydrate column, despite the fact that these may contain sugars as well as polysaccharides. This confusion persists as today some nutritionists use the term complex carbohydrate to refer to any sort of digestible saccharide present in a whole food, where fiber, vitamins and minerals are also found (as opposed to processed carbohydrates, which provide energy but few other nutrients). The standard usage, however, is to classify carbohydrates chemically: simple if they are sugars (monosaccharides and disaccharides) and complex if they are polysaccharides (or oligosaccharides).

In any case, the simple vs. complex chemical distinction has little value for determining the nutritional quality of carbohydrates. Some simple carbohydrates (e.g. fructose) raise blood glucose rapidly, while some complex carbohydrates (starches), raise blood sugar slowly. The speed of digestion is determined by a variety of factors including which other nutrients are consumed with the carbohydrate, how the food is prepared, individual differences in metabolism, and the chemistry of the carbohydrate. Carbohydrates are sometimes divided into "available carbohydrates", which are absorbed in the small intestine and "unavailable carbohydrates", which pass to the large intestine, where they are subject to fermentation by the gastrointestinal microbiota.

The glycemic index (GI) and glycemic load concepts have been developed to characterize food behavior during human digestion. They rank carbohydrate-rich foods based on the rapidity and magnitude of their effect on blood glucose levels. Glycemic index is a measure of how quickly food glucose is absorbed, while glycemic load is a measure of the total absorbable glucose in foods. The insulin index is a similar, more recent classification method that ranks foods based on their effects on blood insulin levels, which are caused by glucose (or starch) and some amino acids in food.

Health effects of dietary carbohydrate restriction 

Low-carbohydrate diets may miss the health advantages – such as increased intake of dietary fiber – afforded by high-quality carbohydrates found in legumes and pulses, whole grains, fruits, and vegetables. A "meta-analysis, of moderate quality," included as adverse effects of the diet halitosis, headache and constipation.

Carbohydrate-restricted diets can be as effective as low-fat diets in helping achieve weight loss over the short term when overall calorie intake is reduced. An Endocrine Society scientific statement said that "when calorie intake is held constant [...] body-fat accumulation does not appear to be affected by even very pronounced changes in the amount of fat vs carbohydrate in the diet." In the long term, effective weight loss or maintenance depends on calorie restriction, not the ratio of macronutrients in a diet. The reasoning of diet advocates that carbohydrates cause undue fat accumulation by increasing blood insulin levels, and that low-carbohydrate diets have a "metabolic advantage", is not supported by clinical evidence. Further, it is not clear how low-carbohydrate dieting affects cardiovascular health, although two reviews showed that carbohydrate restriction may improve lipid markers of cardiovascular disease risk.

Carbohydrate-restricted diets are no more effective than a conventional healthy diet in preventing the onset of type 2 diabetes, but for people with type 2 diabetes, they are a viable option for losing weight or helping with glycemic control. There is limited evidence to support routine use of low-carbohydrate dieting in managing type 1 diabetes. The American Diabetes Association recommends that people with diabetes should adopt a generally healthy diet, rather than a diet focused on carbohydrate or other macronutrients.

An extreme form of low-carbohydrate diet – the ketogenic diet – is established as a medical diet for treating epilepsy. Through celebrity endorsement during the early 21st century, it became a fad diet as a means of weight loss, but with risks of undesirable side effects, such as low energy levels and increased hunger, insomnia, nausea, and gastrointestinal discomfort.(scientific citation needed)  The British Dietetic Association named it one of the "top 5 worst celeb diets to avoid in 2018".

Source 

Most dietary carbohydrates contain glucose, either as their only building block (as in the polysaccharides starch and glycogen), or together with another monosaccharide (as in the hetero-polysaccharides sucrose and lactose). Unbound glucose is one of the main ingredients of honey. Glucose is extremely abundant and has been isolated from a variety of natural sources across the world, including male cones of the coniferous tree Wollemia nobilis in Rome, the roots of Ilex asprella plants in China, and straws from rice in California.

 The carbohydrate value is calculated in the USDA database and does not always correspond to the sum of the sugars, the starch, and the "dietary fiber".

Metabolism

Carbohydrate metabolism is the series of biochemical processes responsible for the formation, breakdown and interconversion of carbohydrates in living organisms.

The most important carbohydrate is glucose, a simple sugar (monosaccharide) that is metabolized by nearly all known organisms. Glucose and other carbohydrates are part of a wide variety of metabolic pathways across species: plants synthesize carbohydrates from carbon dioxide and water by photosynthesis storing the absorbed energy internally, often in the form of starch or lipids. Plant components are consumed by animals and fungi, and used as fuel for cellular respiration. Oxidation of one gram of carbohydrate yields approximately 16 kJ (4 kcal) of energy, while the oxidation of one gram of lipids yields about 38 kJ (9 kcal). The human body stores between 300 and 500 g of carbohydrates depending on body weight, with the skeletal muscle contributing to a large portion of the storage. Energy obtained from metabolism (e.g., oxidation of glucose) is usually stored temporarily within cells in the form of ATP. Organisms capable of anaerobic and aerobic respiration metabolize glucose and oxygen (aerobic) to release energy, with carbon dioxide and water as byproducts.

Catabolism
Catabolism is the metabolic reaction which cells undergo to break down larger molecules, extracting energy. There are two major metabolic pathways of monosaccharide catabolism: glycolysis and the citric acid cycle.

In glycolysis, oligo- and polysaccharides are cleaved first to smaller monosaccharides by enzymes called glycoside hydrolases. The monosaccharide units can then enter into monosaccharide catabolism. A 2 ATP investment is required in the early steps of glycolysis to phosphorylate Glucose to Glucose 6-Phosphate (G6P) and Fructose 6-Phosphate (F6P) to Fructose 1,6-biphosphate (FBP), thereby pushing the reaction forward irreversibly. In some cases, as with humans, not all carbohydrate types are usable as the digestive and metabolic enzymes necessary are not present.

Carbohydrate chemistry
Carbohydrate chemistry is a large and economically important branch of organic chemistry. Some of the main organic reactions that involve carbohydrates are:

 Amadori rearrangement
 Carbohydrate acetalisation
 Carbohydrate digestion
 Cyanohydrin reaction
 Koenigs–Knorr reaction
 Lobry de Bruyn–Van Ekenstein transformation
 Nef reaction
 Wohl degradation

See also 

 Bioplastic
 Carbohydrate NMR
 Gluconeogenesis - A process where glucose can be synthesized by non-carbohydrate sources.
 Glycobiology
 Glycogen
 Glycoinformatics
 Glycolipid
 Glycome
 Glycomics
 Glycosyl
 Macromolecule
 Saccharic acid

References

Further reading

External links 

 Carbohydrates, including interactive models and animations (Requires MDL Chime)
 IUPAC-IUBMB Joint Commission on Biochemical Nomenclature (JCBN): Carbohydrate Nomenclature
 Carbohydrates detailed
 Carbohydrates and Glycosylation – The Virtual Library of Biochemistry, Molecular Biology and Cell Biology
 Functional Glycomics Gateway, a collaboration between the Consortium for Functional Glycomics and Nature Publishing Group

 
Nutrition